Alexei Borisovich Berngard (born in 1978, Chita Oblast, RSFSR, Soviet Union ) is a Russian serviceman, colonel. Berngard is deputy brigade commander of the 810th Guards Naval Infantry Brigade. He earned the Hero of the Russian Federation for participation in the Russian invasion of Ukraine and his leadership during the Battle of Volnovakha.

References

Notes

External links 
 Алексей Борисович Бернгард. Герои страны

1978 births
Living people
People from Zabaykalsky Krai
Russian military personnel of the 2022 Russian invasion of Ukraine
Russian military personnel of the Syrian civil war
Heroes of the Russian Federation
Far Eastern Higher Combined Arms Command School alumni
Russian military personnel
21st-century Russian military personnel
Russian Navy personnel
Russian colonels